Kampong Puni is a village in Temburong District, Brunei, about  from the district town Bangar. The population was 288 in 2016. It is one of the villages within Mukim Bangar. The postcode is PA3751.

Facilities 
Puni Primary School is the village's government primary school. It also shares grounds with Puni Religious School, the village's government school for the country's Islamic religious primary education.

The village mosque is Kampong Puni Mosque. It was inaugurated on 5 November 1982 and can accommodate 200 worshippers.

References 

Puni